Paul Marshall (born October 22, 1966) is an American retired professional ice hockey defenseman who played in the Finnish Liiga, International Hockey League (IHL), and East Coast Hockey League (ECHL).

Career 
After four seasons at Boston College, where he was team captain his senior season, Marshall started his professional career in Finland with Ilves. He returned to North America after one season and played four more pro seasons in the IHL and ECHL. He was a Second Team All-Star during his final two seasons with the Birmingham Bulls.

Marshall was drafted in the fourth round of the 1985 NHL Entry Draft by the Philadelphia Flyers.

Career statistics

References

External links

1966 births
Living people
Albany Choppers players
American men's ice hockey defensemen
Birmingham Bulls (ECHL) players
Boston College Eagles men's ice hockey players
Dayton Bombers players
Ice hockey players from Massachusetts
Ilves players
Kalamazoo Wings (1974–2000) players
Philadelphia Flyers draft picks
San Diego Gulls (IHL) players
Sportspeople from Quincy, Massachusetts
New Jersey Rockin' Rollers players